Daniel Rossouw (born 30 April 1970) is a South African cricketer. He played in 20 first-class and 28 List A matches between 1994/95 and 1999/00.

See also
 List of Eastern Province representative cricketers

References

External links
 

1970 births
Living people
South African cricketers
Eastern Province cricketers
North West cricketers
Cricketers from Port Elizabeth